Étienne-François-Louis-Honoré Letourneur, Le Tourneur, or Le Tourneur de la Manche (15 March 1751 – 4 October 1817) was a French lawyer, soldier, and politician of the French Revolution.

Early career
Born in Granville, Manche, he studied at a military school, then served in the Nord, and in Cherbourg. In 1792, he was elected to the Legislative Assembly for Manche, and voted in favor of King Louis XVI's execution, against a suspended sentence (but in favor of possibility of appeal to the people's mercy).

Republic and Empire

Letourneur served the Republic's National Convention as an overseer of defense during the Siege of Toulon, and took the task of reorganizing the Mediterranean Fleet. He was elected to the French Directory's Council of Ancients, became one of the government leaders ("directors") on 2 November 1795. In April 1797 he left office, under the system whereby one director retired each year, chosen by lot (illustration). He then became a general of the French Revolutionary Army.

Under the Consulate, Letourneur was designated by Napoleon Bonaparte préfet of the Loire-Inférieure département, then counsel for the Cour des Comptes. Nevertheless, Letourneur was exiled after the end of the French Empire, living the rest of his life in Brussels.

References

1751 births
1817 deaths
People from Manche
Directeurs of the First French Republic
First French Empire
French generals
French jurists
Military leaders of the French Revolutionary Wars
French interior ministers